The genus Tanatchivia is a genus of insect in the family Asilidae.

References

Asilidae